The 1898 All-Western college football team consists of American football players selected to the All-Western teams chosen by various selectors for the 1898 college football season.

All-Western selections

Ends
 Neil Snow, Michigan (CW) (CFHOF)
 John W. F. Bennett, Michigan (CW)

Tackles
 Allen Steckle, Michigan (CW)
 Bothne, Northwestern (CW)

Guards
 Clarence James Rogers, Chicago (CW)
 Bunge, Beloit (CW)

Centers
 William Cunningham, Michigan (CW)

Quarterbacks
 Walter S. Kennedy, Chicago (CW)

Halfbacks
 William Caley, Michigan (CW)
 Frank Louis Slaker, Chicago (CW)

Fullbacks 
 Pat O'Dea, Wisconsin (CW) (CFHOF)

Key
CW = Caspar Whitney, for Harper's Weekly

CFHOF = College Football Hall of Fame

See also
1898 College Football All-America Team

References

1898 Western Conference football season
All-Western college football teams